Drimia is a genus of flowering plants. In the APG IV classification system, it is placed in the family Asparagaceae, subfamily Scilloideae (formerly the family Hyacinthaceae). When broadly circumscribed, the genus includes a number of other genera previously treated separately, including Litanthus, Rhodocodon, Schizobasis and Urginea.

One of the best-known species is the sea squill, Drimia maritima (formerly Urginea maritima). Drimia intricata (formerly Schizobasis intricata) is sometimes cultivated as a bulbous or succulent plant.

Description
Drimia species are usually deciduous, more rarely evergreen, growing from bulbs. The bulbs may be underground or occur on or near the surface. Each bulb has one to several leaves that are often dry by the time the flowers open. The inflorescence is in the form of a raceme, with one to many flowers. At least the lower inflorescence bracts have spurs (a characteristic of the tribe Urgineeae). The individual flowers generally last for only one to two days and have white to yellowish green or brown tepals that are either free or joined into a basal tube. The tepals often have a darker central keel. After fertilization, an ovoid capsule forms with several seeds in each locule. The seeds are black and winged.

Taxonomy
A formal description of genus Drimia first appeared in the fourth edition of Species Plantarum, published in 1799, authored by Carl Ludwig Willdenow. The name was attributed to Nikolaus Joseph von Jacquin. When describing Drimia elata (the type species of the genus) in a work published in 1797, Jacquin said that he was unable to assign it to one of the known genera, and so constructed a new one. The name is erived from the Greek  drimeia, the feminine form of the adjective  drimys meaning "bitter" or "acrid", referring to the root.

The boundaries between genera within the Scilloideae are not completely settled. The situation has been described as being in a "state of flux". As early as 1977, it was suggested that Urginea be merged into Drimia, although other small genera continued to be kept separate. In 2000, Peter Goldblatt and John Charles Manning proposed including other related genera, including Litanthus, Rhadamanthus and Schizobasis, a position supported later by some molecular phylogenetic studies. This broad circumscription of Drimia is accepted by the World Checklist of Selected Plant Families. Other sources prefer to maintain a larger number of segregate genera. Regardless of whether a broad or strict view is taken of Drimia, it is placed in the tribe Urgineeae of the subfamily Scilloideae (or the subfamily Urgineoideae of the family Hyacinthaceae if this family is separated from Asparagaceae).

Litanthus group
The genus Litanthus was for a long time monotypic, with the sole species L. pusillus, before in 2000 Goldblatt and Manning included it in Drimia. A further species, Drimia stenocarpa, was added to the group in 2014. The Litanthus group is characterized by one- or occasionally two-flowered inflorescences with drooping tubular flowers whose tepals are united at the base for more than half their length.

Rhodocodon group
The genus Rhodocodon was included in Drimia by Goldblatt and Manning in 2000. The species of Rhodocodon, or the Rhodocodon group within Drimia, including D. cryptopoda, form a well supported clade endemic to Madagascar. They appear to be the product of a single invasion of Madagascar by an African species. A total of 13 species are recognized by those who separate the genus from Drimia.

Schizobasis group
The genus Schizobasis was included in Drimia by Goldblatt and Manning in 2000. As many as eight species have been described, but in 2014 these were reduced to two: Drimia intricata, including all the previously described species, and the new species Drimia sigmoidea. The Schizobasis group is distinguished by its well branched, thin-stemmed inflorescence and small, filiform leaves that are found only in seedlings, disappearing in mature plants.

Species
, the World Checklist of Selected Plant Families accepted 100 species:

Drimia acarophylla E.Brink & A.P.Dold
Drimia albiflora (B.Nord.) J.C.Manning & Goldblatt
Drimia altissima (L.f.) Ker Gawl.
Drimia anomala (Baker) Baker
Drimia aphylla (Forssk.) J.C.Manning & Goldblatt
Drimia arenicola (B.Nord.) J.C.Manning & Goldblatt
Drimia aurantiaca (H.Lindb.) J.C.Manning & Goldblatt
Drimia barkerae Oberm. ex J.C.Manning & Goldblatt
Drimia basutica (E.Phillips) ined.
Drimia brachystachys (Baker) Stedje
Drimia calcarata (Baker) Stedje
Drimia capensis (Burm.f.) Wijnands
Drimia chalumnensis A.P.Dold & E.Brink
Drimia ciliata (L.f.) J.C.Manning & Goldblatt
Drimia cochlearis Mart.-Azorín
Drimia congesta Bullock
Drimia convallarioides (L.f.) J.C.Manning & Goldblatt
Drimia cremnophila van Jaarsv.
Drimia cryptopoda (Baker) Pfosser
Drimia cyanelloides (Baker) J.C.Manning & Goldblatt
Drimia delagoensis (Baker) Jessop
Drimia dregei (Baker) J.C.Manning & Goldblatt
Drimia duthieae (Adamson) Jessop
Drimia echinostachya (Baker) Eggli & N.R.Crouch
Drimia edwardsii N.R.Crouch & Mart.-Azorín
Drimia elata Jacq.
Drimia excelsa J.C.Manning & Goldblatt
Drimia exigua Stedje
Drimia exuviata (Jacq.) Jessop
Drimia fasciata (B.Nord.) J.C.Manning & Goldblatt
Drimia filifolia (Poir.) J.C.Manning & Goldblatt
Drimia fimbrimarginata Snijman
Drimia flagellaris T.J.Edwards
Drimia fragrans (Jacq.) J.C.Manning & Goldblatt
Drimia fugax (Moris) Stearn
Drimia glaucescens (Engl. & K.Krause) H.Scholz
Drimia guineensis (Speta) J.C.Manning & Goldblatt
Drimia haworthioides Baker
Drimia hesperantha J.C.Manning & Goldblatt
Drimia hesperia (Webb & Berthel.) J.C.Manning & Goldblatt
Drimia hockii De Wild.
Drimia hyacinthoides Baker
Drimia incerta A.Chev. ex Hutch.
Drimia indica (Roxb.) Jessop
Drimia intricata (Baker) J.C.Manning & Goldblatt
Drimia involuta (J.C.Manning & Snijman) J.C.Manning & Goldblatt
Drimia johnstonii (Baker) J.C.Manning & Goldblatt
Drimia kniphofioides (Baker) J.C.Manning & Goldblatt
Drimia laxiflora Baker
Drimia ledermannii K.Krause
Drimia ligulata J.C.Manning & Goldblatt
Drimia loedolffiae van Jaarsv.
Drimia macrantha (Baker) Baker
Drimia macrocarpa Stedje
Drimia macrocentra (Baker) Jessop
Drimia marginata (Thunb.) Jessop
Drimia maritima (L.) Stearn
Drimia mascarenensis (Baker) J.C.Manning & Goldblatt
Drimia maura (Maire) J.C.Manning & Goldblatt
Drimia media Jacq. ex Willd.
Drimia minuta Goldblatt & J.C.Manning
Drimia multifolia (G.J.Lewis) Jessop
Drimia multisetosa (Baker) Jessop
Drimia mzimvubuensis van Jaarsv.
Drimia nagarjunae (Hemadri & Swahari) Anand Kumar
Drimia nana (Snijman) J.C.Manning & Goldblatt
Drimia noctiflora (Batt. & Trab.) Stearn
Drimia numidica (Jord. & Fourr.) J.C.Manning & Goldblatt
Drimia occultans G.Will.
Drimia oliverorum J.C.Manning
Drimia ollivieri (Maire) Stearn
Drimia pancration (Steinh.) J.C.Manning & Goldblatt
Drimia polyantha (Blatt. & McCann) Stearn
Drimia polyphylla (Hook.f.) Ansari & Sundararagh.
Drimia porphyrantha (Bullock) Stedje
Drimia psilostachya (Welw. ex Baker) J.C.Manning & Goldblatt
Drimia pulchromarginata J.C.Manning & Goldblatt
Drimia pusilla Jacq. ex Willd.
Drimia razii Ansari
Drimia rupicola (Trimen) Dassan. in M.D.Daddanayake & al. (eds.)
Drimia salteri (Compton) J.C.Manning & Goldblatt
Drimia sanguinea (Schinz) Jessop
Drimia saniensis (Hilliard & B.L.Burtt) J.C.Manning & Goldblatt
Drimia sclerophylla J.C.Manning & Goldblatt
Drimia secunda (B.Nord.) J.C.Manning & Goldblatt
Drimia senegalensis (Kunth) J.C.Manning & Goldblatt
Drimia sigmoidea J.C.Manning & J.M.J.Deacon
Drimia simensis (Hochst. ex A.Rich.) Stedje
Drimia sphaerocephala Baker in W.H.Harvey & auct. suc. (eds.)
Drimia stenocarpa J.C.Manning & J.M.J.Deacon
Drimia sudanica Friis & Vollesen
Drimia tazensis (Batt. & Maire) Stearn
Drimia undata Stearn
Drimia uniflora J.C.Manning & Goldblatt
Drimia uranthera (R.A.Dyer) J.C.Manning & Goldblatt
Drimia urgineoides (Baker) J.C.Manning & Goldblatt
Drimia vermiformis J.C.Manning & Goldblatt
Drimia virens (Schltr.) J.C.Manning & Goldblatt
Drimia viridula (Baker) J.C.Manning & Goldblatt
Drimia wightii Lakshmin.

In addition, 10 species described in 2015, and placed by the authors in Rhodocodon, are, treated as "unplaced" in the World Checklist of Selected Plant Families, which does not recognize the genus; none have names in Drimia:

Rhodocodon apiculatus H.Perrier ex Knirsch, Mart.-Azorín & Wetschnig
Rhodocodon calcicola Knirsch, Mart.-Azorín & Wetschnig
Rhodocodon campanulatus Knirsch, Mart.-Azorín & Wetschnig
Rhodocodon cyathiformis H.Perrier ex Knirsch, Mart.-Azorín & Wetschnig
Rhodocodon floribundus H.Perrier ex Knirsch, Mart.-Azorín & Wetschnig
Rhodocodon graciliscapus Knirsch, Mart.-Azorín & Wetschnig
Rhodocodon intermedius H.Perrier ex Knirsch, Mart.-Azorín & Wetschnig
Rhodocodon linearifolius Knirsch, Mart.-Azorín & Wetschnig
Rhodocodon monophyllus Knirsch, Mart.-Azorín & Wetschnig
Rhodocodon rotundus H.Perrier ex Knirsch, Mart.-Azorín & Wetschnig

Distribution and habitat
The broadly defined genus has about 100 species found in Africa, including Madagascar, the Mediterranean area and Asia. About half of all the species occur in southern Africa, where species diversity is greatest in semi-arid regions with winter rainfall. Drimia generally is found in regions with seasonal dryness.

References

Bibliography 

 

Scilloideae
Asparagaceae genera